This is a list of the 25 members of the European Parliament for Belgium in the 1999 to 2004 session.

List

Party representation

Notes

Belgium
1999
List